Nais is a genus of Naididae.

The genus was described in 1774 by Otto Friedrich Müller.

It has cosmopolitan distribution.

Species:
 Nais communis
 Nais elinguis
 Nais variabilis

References

External links

Tubificina